Peroz II, also known as Gushnasp-Bandeh was king of Persia. He was son of Mah-Adhur Gushnasp and Kahar-dukht, who was daughter of Yazdandad son of Khosrau I. Peroz II reigned only for a short time in 631 CE, until he was killed by Sasanian nobles.

References

630 deaths
7th-century Sasanian monarchs
Year of birth unknown